Gilbert L. Rochon was the 6th president of Tuskegee University, serving from November 1, 2010 – October 21, 2013.

Biography

Early life 

Rochon was born in New Orleans, Louisiana, as the elder of three brothers (Gilbert, Stephen and Gregory), who were raised with their mother, Ursula Rochon, in the home of their grandfather, Emile Carrere, a member of the International Brotherhood of Sleeping Car Porters. Stephen Rochon became the second African-American admiral in U.S. Coast Guard history and was later appointed director of the Executive Residence and chief usher of the White House under Presidents George W. Bush and Barack Obama. Gregory Rochon was elected president of the International Brotherhood of Electrical Workers (IBEW) Local in New Orleans and currently serves as a supervisor for Amtrak at Union Station in Washington, D.C.

Education 
After primary schooling in then-segregated Catholic parochial schools in New Orleans, Rochon entered seminaries of the Society of the Divine Word in Bay St. Louis, Mississippi, and in Epworth, Iowa, in preparation for the Catholic priesthood. He transferred from the seminary to Xavier University of Louisiana and completed his undergraduate degree in English. After initially studying philosophy at the Yale University'  graduate school, he served as a community organizer in New Haven, Connecticut,   returning to Yale to receive the Master of Public Health (MPH) degree in Health Services Administration from the Yale School of Medicine, with a master's thesis addressing boundary management issues in a drug addiction triage facility. He later received his Ph.D. degree in Urban & Regional Planning from MIT, focusing on remote sensing of drought-related famine conditions in Sudan's Gezira.

Rochon is an African-American higher education academician and teacher/researcher, who currently serves on the President's Council at the University of New Orleans, on the board of directors of Eastern National, on the advisory board of the Center of Excellence for Remote Sensing Education and Research at Elizabeth City State University, Advisory Board of the Curtis Robinson Men's Health Institute, and on the Research Committee of the Cobb Institute – National Medical Association.

Rochon is the former president of Tuskegee University (6th president – 2010–2013), associate vice president for collaborative research and engagement at Purdue University (2002–2010), research community planner/research team leader with the US Environmental Protection Agency's National Risk Management Research Laboratory (2000–2002) and director/chair of urban studies and public policy for Dillard University (1982–2000). Rochon's research has focused primarily on the applications of real-time earth-observing satellite remote sensing data and geographic information systems (GIS) data products, in support of time-critical events, sustainable development and environmental sustainability. He is a senior member of IEEE, a member of the Geoscience and Remote Sensing Society (GRSS) and of the Society for College and University Planning (SCUP). For the past several years he directed a NATO Science for Peace project that is enabling two universities in Morocco (i.e. Abdelmalek Essaâdi University-Tangier and Al Akhawayn University – Ifrane) to collect and utilize real-time satellite data for early warning of an array of natural disasters (e.g. storms, flooding, forest fires) and epidemics, through identification and monitoring of infectious disease vector habitat.

Rochon's previous higher education experience includes eight years as associate vice president for collaborative research and engagement at Purdue University-West Lafayette, Indiana, where he established the Purdue Terrestrial Observatory, was founding editor of the Journal of Terrestrial Observation, initiated and directed the Purdue Research Opportunities Program, was senior scientist for the Rosen Center for Advanced Computing and served as interim director for the Laboratory for Applications of Remote Sensing (LARS). (See Purdue University below).

Prior to his appointment at Purdue, Rochon served eighteen years as director, then chair of the Urban Studies & Public Policy Institute at Dillard University in New Orleans, Louisiana (see Dillard University below), where he received tenure and was appointed to a Conrad Hilton Endowed Professorship.

Rochon also held adjunct faculty appointments at Mae Fah Luang University- Chang Rai, Thailand; Indiana University School of Medicine, Dept. of Public Health; University of Cincinnati's College of Planning; Miami University of Ohio's Interdisciplinary Studies Dept.; and Tulane University's School of Public Health and Tropical Medicine, Dept. of Health Systems Management.

Rochon held successive joint federal government appointments with NASA Stennis Space Center; USDA Forest Service; U.S. Naval Oceanographic Office (NAVOCEANO); the Environmental Protection Agency (EPA) National Risk Management Research Lab in Cincinnati; and, under Northrop Grumman/Logicon sub-contracts, with the DOD High Performance Computing Modernization Office's Programming Environment & Training (PET) Program. Rochon also received fellowships from the United Nations University (UNU) while based in Sudan, NASA Goddard Space Flight Center, NASA Jet Propulsion Lab (JPL), the Dorothy Danforth Compton Foundation, and twice served as a Fulbright Senior Specialist-Environmental Technology in Thailand.

Tuskegee University accomplishments 

During his tenure as president and university professor at Tuskegee University (Tuskegee, Alabama, US), the endowment increased to its highest level in the school's history, exceeding $122 million. Tuskegee ranked No. 1 in research expenditures among all 350+ baccalaureate colleges in the US, as reported by Washington Monthly, and was designated a Center of Excellence in Nanobiomaterials by the National Science Foundation and a National Center of Academic Excellence in Information Assurance by the NSA.

Personal life 
Rochon is married to Patricia Saul Rochon, former chair of Mass Communications at Dillard University and clinical assistant professor of digital media at Purdue University. They have one daughter and one son.

He is Catholic.

Selected publications 

 Gilbert L. Rochon and Thierno Thiam. "Democracy & Education: Evolution of the Tuskegee University Governance Model," in Council of Europe Reimaging Democratic Societies: A New Era of Personal and Social Responsibility; Co-Editors: Ira Harkavy, Sjur Bergan and Hilligje van't Land. . http://book.coe.int, Feb. 7, 2013.
 Gilbert L. Rochon. "Remote Sensing for Disaster Response," in Barney Warf, Piotr Jankowski, Barry Solomon, et al., editors. Encyclopedia of Geography. Sage Publications Reference Project, six volume set, September, 2010, 3,560 pages. http://www.sagepub.com/books/Book230922. 
 Gilbert L. Rochon, Joseph E. Quansah, Souleymane Fall, Bereket Araya, Larry L. Biehl, Thierno Thiam, Sohaib Ghani, Lova Rakotomalala, Hildred S. Rochon, Angel Torres Valcarcel, Bertin Hilaire Mbongo, Jinha Jung, Darion Grant, Wonkook Kim, Abdur Rahman M. Maud & Chetan Maringanti. "Remote Sensing, Public Health & Disaster Mitigation," in Nancy Hoalst-Pullen and Mark W. Patterson, Eds. Geotechnologies & the Environment, Part IV Human Health & the Environment, Chapter 11, pp. 187–210, NY: Springer, 2010.
 Gilbert L. Rochon, Larry Biehl, Darion Grant, Souleymane Fall, Thierno Thiam, Bereket Araya, Bertin Hilaire Mbongo, Jinha Jung, Sohaib Ghani, Madgy Abdel Wahab, Gamal Salah El Afandi, Gülay Altay, Okan Ersoy, Angel Torres Valcarcel and Cesar Javier Gonzalez, "Real-Time Remote Sensing in Support of Ecosystem Services & Sustainability," pp. 217–223, in Peter H. Liotta, W.G. Kepner, J.M. Lancaster and D.A. Mouat, Eds. Achieving Environmental Security: Ecosystems Services & Human Welfare. Amsterdam, Netherlands: IOS Press, August, 2010.
 Joseph E. Quansah, Bernard Engel and Gilbert L. Rochon. "Early Warning Systems: A Review," (2010) Journal of Terrestrial Observation. Vol. 2 Issue 2, Article 5, pp. 24–44. Spring, 2010, Purdue University Press. https://docs.lib.purdue.edu/jto/vol2/iss2/art5
 Gilbert Rochon, Dev. Niyogi, Souleymane Fall, Joseph E. Quansah, Larry Biehl,  Bereket Araya, Chetan Maringanti, Angel Torres Valcarcel, Lova Rakotomalala, Hildred S. Rochon, Bertin Hilaire Mbongo & Thierno Thiam. (2010) "Best Management Practices (BMPs) for Corporate, Academic and Governmental Transfer of Sustainable Technology to Developing Countries."  Clean Technologies & Environmental Policy. Vol. 12, Issue 1, pp. 19–30, February, 2010. Special Issue on Best Management Practices for Technology Transfer to Industry.  . 4/28/09 ISSN 1618-954X(Print) 1618-95558 (online). Eds., Antonio Martins & Teresa Mata, Springer: DOI 10.1007/s10098-009-0218-3. 
 Souleymane Fall, Noah S. Diffenbaugh, Dev Niyogi, Roger A. Pielke Sr. and Gilbert Rochon. (2010) "Temperature and Equivalent Temperature over the United States (1979–2005). International Journal of Climatology., Vol. 30, Issue 13, 15 November 2010, Pages 2045-2054. DOI: 10.1002/joc.2094 http://www3.interscience.wiley.com/journal/123275386/abstract?CRETRY=1&SRETRY=0
 Gilbert L. Rochon. (2009) "Space-Based Technologies and High Performance Computing in Support of Environmental Sustainability in Developing Countries," Clean Technologies and Environmental Policy. Vol. 11, No. 3/ Sept. 2009. DOI: 10.1007/s10098-009-0254-z. https://doi.org/10.1007%2Fs10098-009-0254-z
 Souleymane Fall, Dev Niyogi, Alexander Gluhovsky, Roger A. Pielke Sr., Eugenia Kalnay and Gilbert Rochon. (2009)  "Impacts of land use land cover on temperature trends over the continental United States: Assessment using the North American Regional Reanalysis." International Journal of Climatology, Vol. 30, Issue 13, 15 November 2010, Pages 1980–1993. DOI 10.1002/joc.1996  
 Gilbert L. Rochon, Dev Niyogi, Alok Chatturvedi, Krishna Madhavan, Raj Arangarasan, Larry Biehl, Joseph Quansah and Souleymane Fall. "Adopting Multisensor Remote Sensing Datasets and Coupled Models for Disaster Management," Ch. 5, pp. 75–100, in Shailesh Nayak & Sisi Zlatanova, Eds., Remote Sensing and GIS Technologies for Monitoring and Prediction of Disasters. Heidelberg: Springer, 2008. DOI 10.1007/978-3-540-79259-8_5 
 Govindaraju, R., B. Engel, D. Ebert, B. Fossum, M. Huber, C. Jafvert, V. Merwade, D. Niyogi, L. Oliver, S. Prabhakar, G. Rochon, C. Song, L. Zhao (2008) "A Vision of Cyberinfrastructure for End-to-End Environmental Explorations (C4E4)" Journal of Hydrologic Engineering. American Society of Civil Engineers DOI 10.1061/(ASCE)1084-0699(2009)14:1(53), 14(1), pp. 53–64.
 Gilbert L. Rochon, Dev Niyogi, Alok Chaturvedi and U.C. Mohanty. "A case for a permanent space for spatial data." Geospatial Today, Vol. 5, No. 2, November, 2006.
 Gilbert L. Rochon, Loring F. Nies, Chad T. Jafvert, Julie A. Stuart, Rabi H. Mohtar, Joseph Quansah and Akilah Martin. "Education in Sustainable Production in US Universities."  Clean Technologies and Environmental Policy. Vol.8, No. 1, pp. 38–48. Springer Verlag (2006). [Originally presented to the NATO CCMS Annual Meeting, May 2–6, 2004, Budapest, Hungary.]
 Gilbert L. Rochon, Chris Johannsen, David Landgrebe, Bernard Engel, Jonathan   Harbor, Sarada Majumder and Larry Biehl. "Remote Sensing as a Tool for Achieving and Monitoring Progress Toward  Sustainability," Clean Technologies and Environmental Policy, Vol. 5, Nos. 2/3, pp. 310–316. Springer-Verlag, August, 2003.
 G. L. Rochon, D. Szlag, F.B. Daniel, and C. Chifos. "Remote Sensing Applications for Sustainable Watershed Management and Food Security," in Gerard Begni, Editor, Observing our Environment from Space: New Solutions for a New Millennium. Lisse, The Netherlands: A.A. Balkema Publishers, 2002.

Notes 

Living people
People from New Orleans
Tuskegee University presidents
Yale School of Medicine alumni
Xavier University of Louisiana alumni
Massachusetts Institute of Technology alumni
Year of birth missing (living people)
African-American academics
African-American Catholics
21st-century African-American people